The first large-scale human trial of the birth control pill was carried out in Puerto Rico in the 1950s. Between conceptualization and legalization of the first birth control drug in the United States in 1960, there were many developments and trials of test drugs. One such trial happened in Puerto Rico in the 1950s. Before the drug was approved as safe in the mainland U.S., many Puerto Rican women were used as test subjects. The trials were conducted by Gregory Pincus and John Rock in 1955. These trials are a major component in the history of the development of female oral contraceptives, occurring in between initial small trial testing on the east coast and the release of the drug for public consumption.

American testing surrounding the Puerto Rico trials 

Starting in 1873, the United States federal government passed a series of laws commonly known as the Comstock Laws. The Comstock Laws criminalized the use of the postal service as a means of sending, obtaining, or possessing items considered obscene or salacious (including books, pamphlets, abortifacients, anything used to "facilitate sex," or containing sexual language, etc.). The Comstock Laws thus basically criminalized contraceptive devices and instruments used in abortion procedures.  The legislation, however, did not prevent women, nor businesses, from continuing to explore and attempt different methods of birth control. Forced underground, abortion often led to unintentional sterilization or death. Over three quarters of self-induced abortions resulted in complications.

Infuriated with the lengths that many were forced to go to in order to regulate their own fertility, women began to push for legal rights to contraceptive methods and more importantly, the rights to govern their own bodies. The movement for public access to birth control started in the early 20th century, propelled by figures like Margaret Sanger. Physicians also lobbied against Comstock Laws, asserting their right to prescribe contraceptives. By the 1930s, U.S. courts were limiting Comstock restrictions on birth control and other purportedly obscene materials.

Important Figures 
Margaret Sanger (1879-1966) was a nurse and life-long advocate of women's reproductive rights. Sanger believed that a woman would never truly be free until she had the right to determine whether she wanted to be a mother, and acted on these beliefs by starting a campaign to educate women about sex. She did this while also working as a nurse treating those who had resorted to illegal and unsafe methods of abortion. After fleeing to England for five years, in order to escape persecution for violating the Comstock Laws, Margaret Sanger returned to the United States and opened up a clinic (now widely known across the United States as Planned Parenthood) in Brooklyn, New York. The clinic offered women information and resources regarding birth control. The clinic quickly gained popularity and women were soon lining up to be educated. Prior to the birth control movement, there was no uniform sexual education for women, and many found it difficult to find information regarding fertility and contraception. The clinic was only opened for ten days before being shut down by authorities for violating the Comstock Act. Sanger was put into jail for 30 days.

Although Sanger's clinic was not a success, the movement for public access to birth control was. By the 1950s there had been a significant amount of research conducted regarding the effects of hormonal drugs. These substances were not explicitly labeled as contraceptive methods, but rather hormonal treatments for infertility, since the laws against contraceptives applied to scientific research as well.

The sentiments from Margaret Sanger regarding family planning and fertility opened up the door for the Dr. John Rock and biologist Gregory Pincus, the leading experts in fertility and hormone disorders in the United States at the time, to join forces in 1953 and develop an oral contraceptive. Pincus had already established himself as an extremely accomplished scientist after achieving in-vitro fertilization in rabbits in 1934, and established the Worcester Foundation for Experimental Biology in 1944. Around the same time, Chemist Dr. Carl Djerassi demonstrated that he was able to synthesize progesterone from a wild yam root found in Mexico. The artificial production of progesterone became a key discovery for future fertility research since it was demonstrated that high doses of progesterone could halt ovulation.

However, even though Pincus and Rock's research plans had been laid out, they still lacked proper funding. This is where Margaret Sanger and Katherine Dexter McCormick, an heiress who would ultimately fund a large part of the research project, came in to play. Sanger and McCormick approached Pincus in 1953 about focusing his research on a hormonal contraceptive that would ultimately enable women to control their reproduction.

Once Rock and Pincus had adequate funding, they were able to begin their research. However, laws in Massachusetts still prohibited any research on contraceptives, and as a result, the researchers were forced to conceal the true purpose of their research. The two biologists had already been able to prove that the contraceptive hormone treatment they had been working on had prevented pregnancies in both rats and rabbits, and wanted to take the trial to human test subjects. Consequently, the two made the decision to test their treatment on patients in the Worcester State Psychiatric Hospital. Once the research team was ready to take the trial further in the form of a wider clinical trial, they had to choose a location which would not only offer them a guise from the U.S. government, but also an opportunity to closely monitor and control their test subjects. In the words of Katherine Dexter McCormick, the scientists needed “… a cage of ovulating females to experiment with.”

Medical researcher Dr. Edris Rice-Wray was also heavily involved with this research and raised early concerns about heavy dosage causing health problems for women. The pharmaceutical company G. D. Searle & Company created the pills for the trial.
After the trials in Puerto Rico, the drug was approved in the U.S. in 1957 for consumer use as a medication to treat severe menstrual side-effects. The drug was approved as a female oral contraceptive, the first in the U.S., in May 1960. G.D. Searle and company profited greatly from widespread sales of the product, although the company was initially extremely hesitant to be associated with the trials in any way.

Drug 

The drug used in this trial was known as Enovid. The drug was a combination of estrogen and progesterone, the same hormones used in modern combined female oral contraceptive pills. Enovid was submitted first for regulatory approval in 1957.

Dosage 

The drug Enovid used in this trial was a much higher dosage than oral contraceptive pills prescribed today. Modern health practices facilitates prescriptions for birth control, averaging about 0.75 milligrams per dose. The original dosing of 10 milligrams is more than 100 times the acceptable concentration of hormones in contraceptive pills today. The original dosage from the trials was eventually dropped to 5 milligrams after severe side effects were observed, including nausea, dizziness, headaches, and blood clots, along with the death of 3 women in Puerto Rico.

Timeline of Enovid 
Enovid was submitted first for regulatory approval in 1957 for the treatment of menstrual disorders and infertility. It was not approved as an oral contraceptive, although it was developed as such.

The trials

Location 
The research team decided that Puerto Rico would be the most suitable place to test out the pill. More specifically, the former municipality of Río Piedras, Puerto Rico where the first trial would take place in 1956. Puerto Rico offered the perfect location for the trials for three key reasons. The first reason was that contraceptives had been legal and socially acceptable in Puerto Rico since 1937, so long as they were being used for medical reasons, rather than “social or economic ones." In fact, researchers from the Social Science Research Center published several research articles in the 1950s concluding that the attitudes of birth control among working-class Puerto Rican families were extremely positive, despite being majority catholic. The second reason was that Puerto Rico was facing a tremendous population boom, along with high rates of poverty and unemployment. The birth-control pill was offered as a solution to overpopulation, and was seen as a way for the United States government to test population control as a global policy. Likewise, mainland social scientists at the time viewed the high rates of poverty and unemployment as being caused by reproduction, consequently putting the brunt of the blame on Puerto Rican women. Such scientists, like J. Mayone Stycos, believed that Puerto Rican women’s “sexual patterns ha[d] become fairly routinized and difficult to change,” and thus needed to be heavily regulated. Lastly, the third major reason why Puerto Rico was the perfect spot for the trials was because Sanger and Pincus’ team had an ally with a strong foothold on the island. Puerto Rico already contained multiple birth control clinics which were originally funded by the U.S. government under the New Deal programs. However, many of these clinics were turned over to the heir of Procter & Gamble and eugenicist Clarence Gamble, who had already been involved in plans led by the government to control the population by pushing women towards sterilization as a method of birth control.

Participants 
When Pincus and Rock began their experiment, over 200 women were registered to take part in the program. The women that were recruited for these trials were “ …the poorest of the poor, had no place else to go, and, short of sterilization, no birth control options,” and were poorly educated. Prior to the trials, sterilization was the most widespread method of birth limitation in Puerto Rico. Moreover, physicians at the time designated contraceptives as “not practical for the majority of people, [but] only for the more intelligent.” Thus, the experiment provided lower income women what they believed was a desirable opportunity to control their fertility while also avoiding sterilization. The women who were given the pills only understood that they would prevent pregnancy and did not know about the potential health and safety risks of taking the pills. As one woman who participated in the trials described it, “[p]hysicians dispatched their assistants to rap on doors throughout the town's slums, telling women they didn't have to have another child if they took the pills regularly. That's how many of the test recruits were found, said Conchita Santos, 80, a lifelong resident…Santos, a homemaker, accepted her first package of pills in 1955, shortly after the birth of her first and only child. ‘You have to do what's best for you and your family,’ she said. ‘It's not easy making a choice like that."’

The women were also not provided any help or care. Margaret Marsh described in her work how many of these women were exploited for their use. During the trial, these women still had the responsibility of caring and providing for their families. Marsh describes how one woman was 30 years old with ten children, and a husband that ”drank heavily and insisted on daily intercourse, but claimed to be too sick to work.” Marsh also described a woman who had five children and a husband who was frequently hospitalized for mental illnesses. At times, this treatment left them unable to work or even care for their family and children.

Drug administration and side effects 
The women were administered 10 milligrams of the experimental combination of estrogen and progesterone, more commonly known as Enovid, the first contraceptive pill. The women participating in the trial began to experience side effects, but their complaints were deemed unreliable and outright dismissed by researchers. Some symptoms reported among patients included dizziness, vomiting, nausea, headache, and menstrual irregularities; some of which were so severe that they required hospitalizations. A small group of female medical students were also recruited to participate in the study, but dropped out due to similar symptoms despite being told that they would receive worse grades if they quit. The researchers believed that these side-effects were insignificant in comparison to what they had discovered; a hormonal oral contraceptive that stopped women from becoming pregnant.

Results 
Despite half of the trial participants dropping out of the experiment and a significant number of pregnancies occurring within the test groups, researchers believed the trials were overall a success. They claimed that the majority of pregnancies occurred when participants either missed pills or withdrew from the study. Thus, they concluded that the pill successfully inhibited ovulation using two steroids: 19-nor-17-ethinyl testosterone and 17-ethinyl estaeneolone. John Rock further proclaimed that the drug “provide a natural means of fertility control such as nature uses after ovulation and during pregnancy.” Enovid was finally approved by the FDA in 1960 as an oral contraceptive.

Deaths 

Three deaths occurred among patients who were taking the birth control drug during these trials. Despite strong circumstantial evidence that the pill was causing these unexpected deaths, they were not reported for two reasons. Firstly, those conducting the trial considered the deaths to be coincidental. Secondly, autopsies were never conducted on the bodies of the three women.

Ethics and controversy 
Even though the contents of the original birth control pill were modified after trials due to the dangerous levels of hormones in its contents, the discovery and the authorization of the pill made a profound impact on women’s reproductive rights in the United States. Women were now able to directly control their own fertility because of the legalization of the pill and the studies that aided in the authorization of the pill. Instead of having to deal with an accidental pregnancy, women were provided the opportunity to delay having children allowing them to pursue higher educational goals or seek employment. Based on statistics, the pill was considered “…one of the most transformational developments in the business sector in the last 85 years. Fully one-third of the wage gains women have made since the 1960s are the result of access to oral contraceptives.” Additionally, studies have shown evidence that “between 1969 and 1980, the dropout rate among women with access to the pill was 35 percent lower than women without access to the pill,” and that “birth control has been estimated to account for more than 30 percent of the increase in the proportion of women in skilled careers from 1970 to 1990.” 

The ethics of the trial in Puerto Rico are still debated. A Puerto Rican woman named Delia Mestre, who participated in the trial unknowingly, struggled with the idea that she and other hundreds of women served as guinea pigs to benefit white women of higher socioeconomic status on the mainland of the United States. When questioned about her participation in the experiments, Mestre explains that "the experiments were both good and bad. Why didn't anyone let us make some decisions for ourselves?" With tears in her eyes, Mestre also stated "I have difficulty explaining that time to my own grown children. I have very mixed feelings about the entire thing." Unfortunately, Mestre and the other women who participated in the trials were not allowed to make an informed decision on whether they wanted to serve in the trials. The bodies and welfare of impoverished women were sacrificed for the benefits of white women and male scientists who considered the pill a milestone in the fields of science and healthcare.

Feminist response to trials 
Angela Davis criticized the unethical nature of the trials. She criticized Margaret Sanger's public statement in support for the implementation of forced contraceptive trials in Puerto Rico as a direct example of the negative rhetoric that harmed minority women. In response, Sanger argued that "morons, mental defectives, epileptics, illiterates, paupers, unemployables, criminals and prostitutes” should be forcibly sterilized or given contraception to limit their reproductive capabilities.  

In her film, La Operación, Ana Maria Garcia interviews women involved in the program. Many women were inadequately advised on procedures, and others argued that they did not have other choices due to the constant coercion.

References 

Clinical trials
Birth control in the United States
Food and Drug Administration
Human subject research in the United States
Health in Puerto Rico
1950s in Puerto Rico
History of women in Puerto Rico